is a former Japanese football player.

Playing career
Takemura was born in Miyoshi on December 6, 1973. After graduating from high school, he joined Fujita Industries (later Bellmare Hiratsuka) in 1992. Although he played as offensive midfielder, he could not become a regular player. In 1998, he moved to Mito HollyHock. In May 1999, he moved to Oita Trinita. He played as regular player for the club in 3 seasons. In 2002, he moved to Omiya Ardija. Although he played many matches in 2002, he could hardly play in the match in 2003. In 2004, he moved to Sagan Tosu. Although he played as regular player in 2004, his opportunity to play decreased from 2005. In 2007, he moved to Regional Leagues club V-Varen Nagasaki. He played many matches and the club was promoted to Japan Football League from 2009. He retired end of 2010 season.

Club statistics

References

External links

1973 births
Living people
Association football people from Hiroshima Prefecture
Japanese footballers
J1 League players
J2 League players
Japan Football League (1992–1998) players
Japan Football League players
Shonan Bellmare players
Mito HollyHock players
Oita Trinita players
Omiya Ardija players
Sagan Tosu players
V-Varen Nagasaki players
Association football midfielders